1988 Paralympics may refer to:
1988 Summer Paralympics
1988 Winter Paralympics